Megalonotini is a tribe of dirt-colored seed bugs in the family Rhyparochromidae. There are about 19 genera and more than 80 described species in Megalonotini.

Genera
These 21 genera belong to the tribe Megalonotini:

 Afralampes Slater, 1998
 Allocentrum Bergroth, 1894
 Anepsiocoris Puton, 1886
 Anepsiodes Reuter, 1882
 Dermatinoides Slater & Sweet, 1973
 Hadrocnemis Jakovlev, 1881
 Hispanocoris Costas & Vázquez, 1999
 Icus Fieber, 1861
 Lamprodema Fieber, 1861
 Lasiocoris Fieber, 1861
 Leptomelus Jakovlev, 1881
 Megalonotus Fieber, 1861
 Metastenothorax Reuter, 1884
 Microthisus Lindberg, 1958
 Pezocoris Jakovlev, 1875
 Piezoscelis Fieber, 1870
 Polycrates Stal, 1865
 Proderus Fieber, 1861
 Sphragisticus Stal, 1872
 Tempereocoris Pericart, 1995
 Tethallotrum Scudder, 1962

References

Further reading

External links

 

Rhyparochromidae
Articles created by Qbugbot